The Proudly South African campaign is a South African 'buy local' marketing campaign and logo.

Proudly South African was established in 2001, born out of the 1998 Presidential Job Summit which was convened by the late former President Nelson Mandela. Its purpose is to work to combat the triple challenges of poverty, inequality and above all, unemployment by encouraging local investment and consumption of local products.

Cost of membership is billed at a tiered rate based on the annual turnover of the company, with reduced rates for non-governmental organisations.

See also
 Rainbow Nation

References

External links
 

South African culture
Political terminology in South Africa
National production certification marks
2001 in South Africa